is a Japanese origami artist. Known internationally to be a master of the craft, he began folding at age two. Kamiya began designing origami models in 1995, and has since published hundreds of his creations. Perhaps his most famous design is Ryu-Zin 3.5, an elaborate dragon covered with scales and having feelers, claws, and horns. The work can take up to one month to fold properly. Kamiya has drawn inspiration for his designs from Manga, nature, and both eastern and western mythologies.

Many of Kamiya's origami designs are exceptionally complex; his Divine Dragon and Ancient Dragon models require around 275 steps each and need to be made from at least 50 cm squares of thin paper or foil. The Ryu-Zin 3.5 is unique, however, in that the crease pattern is asymmetrical yet produces a symmetrical model. Kamiya has written three books, the most famous of which, Works of Satoshi Kamiya, 1995-2003 includes diagrams of nineteen models of intermediate through complex difficulty. Kamiya's second book, Works of Satoshi Kamiya 2, 2002-2009, released in 2012, includes 16 models and is a follow-up to his debut. Although most of these were previously published in convention books and magazines, it also includes new, previously unpublished diagrams for the famous feathered, long-tailed phoenix.

In June 2019, Kamiya released a third volume of his designs. This book, Works of Satoshi Kamiya 3, contains models previously published in magazines and convention books, as well as models taught in origami classes, like his Tiger and Zero Fighter.

He had designed many great models as Divine boar, Phoenix, Ryujin 3.5, Tiger, Lion, Zero fighter plane, wizard and many more.

Publications
Works of Satoshi Kamiya, 1995-2003 Origami House, 2005. ,  

World of Super-Complex Origami Soshimu, 2010.  (in cooperation with other origamists, like Komatsu Hideo and Takashi Hojyo)

Works of Satoshi Kamiya 2, 2002-2009 Origami House, 2012 (out November 15)

Works of Satoshi Kamiya 3, Origami House, 2019 (out June 15)

See also

Mathematics of origami

References

External links
Satoshi Kamiya's personal website
Full information on Satoshi Kamiya's book

Japanese artists
Origami artists
1981 births
Living people
People from Nagoya